Paratettix cucullatus, the hooded grouse locust, is a species of pygmy grasshopper in the family Tetrigidae. It is found in North America.

References

External links

 

Tetrigidae
Articles created by Qbugbot
Insects described in 1838